, better known as , is a Japanese actress and entertainer who is represented by Yoshimoto Creative Agency. Her aunt is actress Megumi Tama.

Filmography

Films

TV series

References

External links
 

Japanese television personalities
Japanese actresses
1962 births
Living people
People from Tokyo